Forfeit/Fortune (2008) is the fifth studio album recorded by the indie rock band Crooked Fingers. Eric Bachmann provides lead vocals, with Miranda Brown singing backing vocals, Elin Palmer providing backing vocals and violin, and Tim Husmann on drums. Guest appearances on the album include Brian Kotzur (Silver Jews), Tom Hagerman (DeVotchKa), and Neko Case (The New Pornographers).

Track listing
"What Never Comes"
"Luisa's Bones"
"Phony Revolutions"
"Give and Be Taken"
"Let's Not Pretend (To Be New Men)" 
"Cannibals"
"Sinisteria"
"No Me Los Des!"
"Run, Lieutenant, Run"
"Modern Dislocation"
"Your Control"

The song "Luisa's Bones" is used in the TV series, Chuck, when Chuck is gearing up to find information about the "intersect" in Season 2, Episode 19, "Chuck versus the Dream Job".

References

2008 albums
Crooked Fingers albums